Brian Reed Silliman is a marine conservation biologist. He is currently the Rachel Carson Distinguished Professor of Marine Conservation Biology at the Nicholas School of the Environment at Duke University. Silliman received an A.B. and M.Sc. from the University of Virginia. He completed his Ph.D. in Ecology and Evolutionary Biology at Brown University in 2004.

Books 

 ; edited with Peter M. Kareiva and Michelle Marvier

References

External links 

 

Living people
Year of birth missing (living people)
Conservation biologists
American marine biologists
Duke University faculty
University of Virginia alumni
Brown University alumni